Beinn Ghlas is a mountain in the Breadalbane region of the Scottish Highlands. It lies on the north shore of Loch Tay and is part of the Ben Lawers Range.

The Gaelic name is translated as 'grey-green mountain', which refers to the colour of the mica-schist that makes up the bulk of the mountain and that falls as a scree on its south-western side. The path up the mountain leads past outcrops of this rock that also reveal large garnets.

The usual route to the summit leaves from the car park, follows Edramucky Burn, and climbs to the south-western ridge of the mountain.  The deep corrie of Coire Odhar (the dun-coloured corrie) lies to the north.  Walkers who continue on to Ben Lawers can avoid the 100 metre re-ascent of Beinn Ghlas on their return by taking the path that runs west of the summit, down to Coire Odhar.

References

Munros
Mountains and hills of the Southern Highlands
Mountains and hills of Perth and Kinross
National Trust for Scotland properties
One-thousanders of Scotland